Country Stuff is the fifth EP by American country music singer Walker Hayes, released on June 4, 2021, through Monument Records. It was produced by Shane McAnally, Joel Thibodeau, and Hayes.  The EP includes the single "Fancy Like", which hit number one on the Billboard Hot Country Songs chart.

The set debuted at number 26 on Top Country Albums with 7,000 units sold in its first week. It later on rose to its peak at number 4 on the chart.

Critical reception
Florian Buechting of Flyctory.com gave the album a rating of 3.5 out of 5 and said "Country Stuff is rather average. The title track is great, but there are too many weaker songs on this EP as well. The lyrics are typically not too bad – but this unique cheeky, ironic touch in Walker Hayes’ tracks feels to be faded. Bad luck, I loved it." Nicole Piering of Country Swag gave the EP a generally positive review, writing: "As a singer-rapper, Walker Hayes fills a certain niche with undeniably catchy songs like "Country Stuff" and "Fancy Like." However, he truly shines on deeper material, as evidenced on tracks like "Briefcase" and "Make You Cry." The Country Stuff EP allows Hayes to flex both sides of his personality, and there's something for everyone here".

Track listing

Charts

Weekly charts

Year-end charts

References

2021 EPs
Walker Hayes albums
Monument Records EPs
Albums produced by Shane McAnally